Te Quiero (English: I Love You), also known as Te Quiero: Romantic Style In Da World, is the debut album by Panamian singer-songwriter Flex. It was released in late September 21, 2007 in Mexico and Panama and three months later on December 4, 2007 in  United States, peaking at number-one on those three countries. In 2008, it was nominated for a Latin Grammy Award for Best Urban Music Album, which was awarded to Wisin & Yandel's Los Extraterrestres; however, the lead single from this album, "Te Quiero", won the Latin Grammy Award for Best Urban Song. Te Quiero also was nominated for a Lo Nuestro Award for Urban Album of the Year. It won the Billboard Latin Music Award for Latin Rhythm Album of the Year in 2009.

"Te Quiero" was on the Latin Billboard charts all of 2008. It was No. 1 for 20 weeks. Flex performed this song on shows such as the Latin Grammys 2008, Premios Telehit 2008, Cristina, Premios Juventud 2008, One Nation, Vivo, Pepsi Musica, and many more. Thanks to his huge hit, Flex won many awards, received more recognition, and became popular worldwide.

Reception

Jason Birchmeier gave the album two stars who felt that Flex's vocals were "fair at best" while terrible at "Si No Te Tengo". He also criticized the album as being "short on good songs" and that the romantic feel "becomes increasingly overbearing as the album progresses."

Track listing
The information from Billboard.

Standard edition

Fan edition
A fan edition was released including an extended playlist, which contained the same track listing as the standard edition plus three new versions of his hit single "Te Quiero", along with DVD with music videos and bonus features. This edition includes versions with Belinda, a DVD with music videos and bonus features, the original and the spanglish version with Belinda have a music video included in this fan edition.

DVD track listing
Menu
"Te Quiero" - Music video
"Sin Tu Amor" - Music video
"Escápate" - Music video
"Te Quiero" - Karaoke
"Te Quiero (Spanglish)" featuring Belinda - Music video
México 2008 Tour
United States, Colombia and Argentina Tour

Chart performance

Sales and certifications

References

2007 debut albums
Flex (singer) albums
Spanish-language albums